Fjellstad is a village in the municipality of Rælingen, Norway. Its population (2005) is 943.

Villages in Akershus